The 2013 Audi Melbourne Pro Tennis Classic was a professional tennis tournament played on outdoor clay courts. It is the eighth edition of the tournament which was part of the 2013 ITF Women's Circuit, offering a total of $50,000 in prize money. It took place in Indian Harbour Beach, Florida, United States, on April 29 – May 5, 2013.

WTA entrants

Seeds 

 1 Rankings as of April 22, 2013

Other entrants 
The following players received wildcards into the singles main draw:
  Jan Abaza
  Jennifer Brady
  Elizabeth Lumpkin
  Alexandra Stevenson

The following players received entry from the qualifying draw:
  Belinda Bencic
  Louisa Chirico
  Jelena Pandžić
  Alyona Sotnikova

The following player received entry by a Special Exempt:
  Allie Kiick

Champions

Singles 

  Petra Rampre def.  Dia Evtimova 6–0, 6–1

Doubles 

  Jan Abaza /  Louisa Chirico def.  Asia Muhammad /  Allie Will 6–4, 6–4

External links 
 2013 Audi Melbourne Pro Tennis Classic at ITFtennis.com
 Official website

Audi Melbourne Pro Tennis Classic
Clay court tennis tournaments
Tennis tournaments in the United States